Richard Clay Dixon (born c. 1942) is an American politician of the Ohio Democratic party. He served as a city commissioner of Dayton, Ohio, and as the city's mayor. He was the second African-American person to serve as mayor of Dayton.

References

Mayors of Dayton, Ohio
African-American mayors in Ohio
Ohio Democrats
Living people
1942 births
21st-century African-American people
20th-century African-American people